This list of ships built at Meyer Werft contains a selection of ships which were built new by the Meyer Werft GmbH of Papenburg, Germany.

All data is as of delivery from Meyer Werft to the client.

References

External links 

 
 
 More info about a ship can be acquired by entering the ships IMO or MMSI on marinetraffic.com

Meyer Werft